Events in the year 1768 in Norway.

Incumbents
Monarch: Christian VII

Events
 1 December — The slave ship Fredensborg sinks off Tromøya.

Arts and literature
January - Gunnerus Library, the oldest scientific library in Norway is opened in Trondheim.

Births

Full date unknown
Johan Ernst Berg, politician (died 1828)

Deaths
24 January - Morten Leuch, timber merchant and landowner (born 1732).

See also

References